Vlastimil Kroupa (born April 27, 1975 in Most, Czechoslovakia) is a retired Czech professional ice hockey defenceman. Chosen in the second round of the 1993 NHL Entry Draft, 45th overall, by the San Jose Sharks, Kroupa played in parts of 5 seasons with the San Jose Sharks and New Jersey Devils. A tall and skilled defenceman, Kroupa was known for a puck-moving transitional style and a heavy point shot. However, he struggled with the longer NHL season (in comparison to Europe), as well as the more rugged and tough physical aspects of the North American game. After several seasons in the late 1990s spent mostly in the AHL refining his game, Kroupa elected to return to play in his native Czech Republic before the start of the 2000–01 season.

Career statistics

Regular season and playoffs

International

External links

1975 births
Living people
Albany River Rats players
Czech ice hockey defencemen
Essen Mosquitoes players
Kansas City Blades players
Kentucky Thoroughblades players
HC Litvínov players
HC Oceláři Třinec players
HC Sparta Praha players
New Jersey Devils players
Sportspeople from Most (city)
San Jose Sharks draft picks
San Jose Sharks players
Czech expatriate ice hockey players in the United States
Czech expatriate ice hockey players in Germany
Czechoslovak ice hockey defencemen